The Unsinkable Molly Brown is a 1964 American comedy musical western film directed by Charles Walters and starring Debbie Reynolds, filmed in Panavision. The screenplay by Helen Deutsch is based on the book of the 1960 musical The Unsinkable Molly Brown by Richard Morris. The song score was composed by Meredith Willson. Debbie Reynolds was nominated for the Academy Award for Best Actress for her portrayal of Brown.

Plot
Rescued from the Colorado River as an infant and raised by Seamus Tobin, tomboy Molly Tobin is determined to find a wealthy man to marry. She journeys to Leadville, Colorado and is hired as a saloon singer by Christmas Morgan. After miner Johnny Brown renovates his cabin, the two wed, and he sells his claim in a silver mine for $300,000.

The Browns and Seamus move into a Denver mansion, and Molly sets out to improve her social status by trying to ingratiate herself with the city's elite, all of whom snub her and her nouveau riche ways. She and Johnny go to Europe, where they are embraced by royalty, and the couple return to Denver with their new friends. Molly's plan to introduce them to the people who formerly rejected her is derailed by Johnny's rough-and-tumble friends, whose unexpected and boisterous arrival ruins the gala party Molly is hosting.

Molly decides to return to Europe, leaving Johnny behind. She initially falls for the charms of Prince Louis de Lanière, but eventually decides she prefers to live with Johnny in Leadville. For the first time in her life, she realizes that someone else's feelings and priorities need to be considered. When her deed makes international headlines, Molly is welcomed home by Johnny and the people of Denver.

Cast
 Debbie Reynolds as Molly Brown
 Harve Presnell as 'Leadville' Johnny Brown
 Ed Begley as Seamus Tobin
 Jack Kruschen as Christmas Morgan
 Hermione Baddeley as Buttercup Grogan
 Vassili Lambrinos as Prince Louis de Laniere
 Fred Essler as Baron Karl Ludwig von Ettenburg 
 Harvey Lembeck as Polak
 Lauren Gilbert as Mr. Fitzgerald
 Kathryn Card as Mrs. Wadlington 
 Hayden Rorke as Malcolm Broderick
 Harry Holcombe as Mr. Wadlington 
 Amy Douglass as Mrs. Fitzgerald 
 George Mitchell as Monsignor Ryan
 Martita Hunt as Grand Duchess Elise Lupavinova 
 Vaughn Taylor as Mr. Cartwright
 Anthony Eustrel as Roberts
 Audrey Christie as Gladys McGraw
 Grover Dale as Jam 
 Brendan Dillon as Murphy 
 Maria Karnilova as Daphne
 Gus Trikonis as Joe

Production
Harve Presnell was the sole member of the original Broadway cast who was invited to reprise his stage role in the film. Although Tammy Grimes had originated the title role and had won the Tony Award for Best Performance by a Featured Actress in a Musical for her performance, MGM executives wanted Shirley MacLaine for the film. After she signed, producer Hal Wallis claimed she was under contract to him, and MacLaine was forced to withdraw from the project. After this, many people wanted Judy Garland. Garland was reported to be the star of the film in 1961. When Debbie Reynolds was cast instead, MacLaine publicly accused her of agreeing to accept a lower salary in order to land the role, and director Charles Walters, who preferred MacLaine, tried to persuade Reynolds to turn down the part.

Exteriors were filmed in the Black Canyon of the Gunnison National Park in western Colorado. Some brief black-and-white footage from the 1953 movie Titanic, portraying the ill-fated ocean liner's collision with an iceberg and sinking, was interspersed with scenes of Molly Brown aboard the ship and later in a lifeboat.

Only five of the 17 musical numbers from the stage musical were used in the film, and Meredith Willson wrote "He's My Friend" to extend the song score. Peter Gennaro, who had choreographed the original Broadway production, staged the musical sequences.

During production, MGM was putting all its resources into its forthcoming Doctor Zhivago (1965), and at least $1 million was cut from the budget of Molly Brown. Running out of money to complete the film, director Charles Walters proposed cutting the rousing dance number "He's My Friend". To save the number, cast and crew ultimately decided to film it in one rigorous day using multiple cameras to reduce shooting time.

The film grossed $11,070,559 at the domestic box office. It earned $7.5 million in U.S. theatrical rentals.

Musical numbers
 "Belly Up to the Bar, Boys" ... Shamus Tobin, Christmas Morgan, Molly Brown, and Ensemble
 "I Ain't Down Yet" ... Molly Brown
 "Colorado, My Home" ... Johnny Brown
 "I'll Never Say No" ... Johnny Brown and Molly Brown
 "He's My Friend" ... Molly Brown, Johnny Brown, Mrs. Grogan, Grand Duchess Elise Lupovinova, Shamus Tobin, Christmas Morgan, and Ensemble
 "Johnny's Soliloquy" ... Johnny Brown

Reception

Critical reception
A.H. Weiler of The New York Times called the film "big, brassy, bold and freewheeling" but added, "The tones are ringing, but often hollow. Molly is a colorful character all right, and the screen, which is as wide as can be, is filled with vivid colors that help project the fact that this is merely a satisfying musical comedy and not an inspired subject." He continued, "This is not to say that Meredith Willson's score is not tuneful and lilting but to this listener it is good, sweet corn that is more palatable than memorable. Mr. Gennaro, on the other hand, has devised dances that more than complement Mr. Willson's music. They may seem to be improvised but they have the true marks of professionalism in their carefully plotted verve, bounce and exuberance." He concluded, "The Unsinkable Molly Brown, in the person of Miss Reynolds, and the other principals, often mistakes vigor for art. But Metro's lavish and attractive production numbers make up for this basic superficiality. For all of its shallowness, Molly is a cheerful and entertaining addition to the local screen scene."

Variety observed, "In essence, it's a pretty shallow story since the title character, when you get right down to it, is obsessed with a very superficial, egotistical problem beneath her generous, razzmatazz facade. On top of that, Willson's score is rather undistinguished. Debbie Reynolds thrusts herself into the role with an enormous amount of verve and vigor. At times her approach to the character seems more athletic than artful. Harve Presnell ... makes a generally auspicious screen debut as the patient Johnny. His fine, booming voice and physical stature make him a valuable commodity for Hollywood."

Channel 4 called it an "amiable comedy with a handful of good tunes" that "lacks the satirical bite which its story may suggest. Sometimes the director seems to feel more at ease with the melodramatic moments than the comedy ones."

Time Out London noted, "As ebulliently energetic as ever, Reynolds makes the brash social climbing both funny and touching, but the film itself gets trapped in two minds between satire and sentimentality. The score ... though pleasant, is rather thinly spread; but the sets are a delight in the best traditions of the MGM musical, and Walters does a wonderfully graceful job of direction".

TV Guide rated the film three out of four stars and commented, "A rambunctious and spirited effort from Reynolds ... saves this otherwise weakly scripted, familiar musical from the long list of forgotten pictures."

Box office
The film set an opening week record at Radio City Music Hall in New York City, grossing $222,000 and became the number one film in the US that week. It went on to be the highest grossing film at the theater, with a 10-week gross of $2 million.

Awards and honors

Home media
Warner Home Video released the Region 1 DVD on September 19, 2000. The film is in anamorphic widescreen format with an audio track in English and subtitles in English and French. In 2016, Warner Archive released the film on Blu Ray.

Notes

References

External links 

 
 
 
 

1964 films
1964 musical comedy films
American musical comedy films
1960s Western (genre) comedy films
Films about RMS Titanic
Films about survivors of seafaring accidents or incidents
Films based on musicals
Films directed by Charles Walters
Films set in 1912
Films set in the 1910s
Films set in Colorado
Films shot in Colorado
Metro-Goldwyn-Mayer films
Photoplay Awards film of the year winners
1960s English-language films
1960s American films